The Order of battle at the Battle of the Hyères Islands recounts the British Royal Navy and French Navy fleets which participated in a campaign off the Îles d'Hyères during the French Revolutionary Wars. The Battle of the Hyères Islands was an engagement fought for control of the Ligurian Sea, the waters off the Southern French and Northwestern Italian coasts, where British and French forces had clashed since the outbreak of the French Revolutionary Wars in 1793. The battle was an uneven contest, the French, led by Vice-admiral Pierre Martin unwilling to face the larger British fleet under Admiral William Hotham, but losing one ship of the line to British fire as they attempted to escape.

The British had been dominant in the Mediterranean since the destruction of half of the French Mediterranean Fleet at the conclusion of the Siege of Toulon in December 1793. As the French strove to repair and rebuilt their shattered fleet, the British turned to securing the island of Corsica, through an invasion in 1794. The only French naval operation of the year, a cruise by Martin in June, was forced to shelter in the anchorage at Gourjean Bay to avoid destruction. In March 1795 the French had enough serviceable ships to take to sea once more, sailing in the Gulf of Genoa and capturing the damaged HMS Berwick at the action of 8 March 1795.  A few days later Hotham's fleet caught the French and Martin lost two ships at the ensuing Battle of Genoa. During the spring both fleets gained reinforcements from the Atlantic, and in June Martin sailed once more.

Hotham was not initially concerned by French movements, but on 7 July a squadron under Captain Horatio Nelson was chased by the French and Nelson led Martin directly to Hotham's anchorage at San Fiorenzo. Hotham delayed departure but eventually gave chase, pursuing Martin's smaller fleet across the Ligurian Sea. On 13 July off the Îles d'Hyères, the leading British ships caught the trailing French ships and a short battle followed during which the French ship of the line  was isolated, captured and subsequently destroyed by fire. Martin retreated to Fréjus while Hotham, his flagship trailing  behind the action, ordered his ships to pull back. This decision was criticised by his officers at the time and by subsequent historians, and his failure to inflict a decisive defeat on the French at this engagement is often cited as crucial in the forced evacuation of the Mediterranean by all British forces the following year.

Hotham's fleet
Note that as carronades were not traditionally taken into consideration when calculating a ship's rate, these ships may have been carrying more guns than indicated below.
  British Royal Navy
  Navy of the Kingdom of Naples

Martin's fleet
Note that the number of guns refers to the official complement, traditionally taken into consideration when calculating a ship's rate, and that these ships may have been carrying more guns than indicated below, although obusiers were not carried on French ships in this battle. Officers killed in action are marked with a  symbol.

References

Bibliography 
 
 
 
 
 
 
 
  (1671-1870)
 

Conflicts in 1795
French Revolutionary Wars orders of battle